PC-200 or PC200 may refer to
Komatsu PC200, a series of excavators by Komatsu Limited
Sinclair PC200, a computer